Murder at Prime Suites (M@PS) is a 2013 Nigerian crime thriller film directed by Chris Eneng starring Joseph Benjamin, Keira Hewatch and Chelsea Eze. The movie was inspired by a much publicized similar murder that occurred in Lagos. The film stars Joseph Benjamin and Keira Hewatch.

Plot
When Florence Ngwu (Chelsea Eze) is gruesomely murdered in a hotel by an unknown culprit, Agent Ted (Joseph Benjamin) is sent in to investigate the circumstances that led to her death and make sure that justice prevails.

Cast 
 Joseph Benjamin as Agent Ted
 Keira Hewatch as Agent Hauwa
 Chelsea Eze as Florence Ngwu
 Okey Uzoeshi as Jide Coker
 Stan Nze as Adolf

Reception 
Reactions to the film varied from mixed to positive, with Sodas and Popcorns giving it a 3 out of 5 average score and stating "It’s a nice movie, its different, its creative, but some screws seemed a bit loose which didn’t make the experience any better than this for me."

The film received nominations at the 2014 Africa Magic Viewers Choice Awards in the categories Best Movie (Drama) and Best Sound.

See also
 List of Nigerian films of 2013

References 

2013 films
English-language Nigerian films
Nigerian crime thriller films
Films shot in Lagos
Films set in Lagos
2013 crime thriller films
Nigerian detective films
Police detective films
2010s English-language films